Golf was contested at the 2007 Summer Universiade from August 14 to 17 at the Water Mill Golf and Gardens in Bangkok, Thailand.

Medal winners

Medal table

References 

2007 Summer Universiade
Universiade
Golf at the Summer Universiade